The route of the 1957 Tour de France contained many mountains, so mountain specialists Charly Gaul and Federico Bahamontes were considered as the favourites. Gaul had requested to ride in the Dutch team, but this was not allowed. Louison Bobet and Raphael Géminiani, two important French cyclists, did not race in 1957, so the French team needed new stars. The team was then built around young Jacques Anquetil, who had broken the hour record earlier that year.

The riders who had been favourites in previous years had stopped racing (Fausto Coppi), had lost their greatness (Hugo Koblet), or had chosen not to participate (Louison Bobet). As a result, there was no outspoken favourite.
Roger Walkowiak, who had won the previous edition, had not shown good results since. Gaul had lost the 1957 Giro d'Italia when he was almost sure of winning it, so he was not considered to be in great form. Gastone Nencini, who won the 1957 Giro, was not considered constant enough. The Spanish team was considered the best Spanish team ever, but they were more a favourite for the mountain classification than for the general classification. The Belgian team was focussed around Jan Adriaensens.

Start list

By team

By rider

By nationality

References

1957 Tour de France
1957